A swingletree (British Isles) or singletree (North America) is a wooden or metal bar used to balance the pull of a draught horse or other draught animal when pulling a vehicle.  It is a kind of whippletree, and the term is also used sometimes for other whippletrees.

It is a horizontal bar, attached or suspended in the middle, and able to hinge fore-and-aft in a horizontal plane.  The traces (the straps by which the animal pulls) attach to its ends, and the vehicle is pulled from its middle.

The centre of the swingletree may be bolted directly to the body of the vehicle, this bolt pulling the vehicle along.  Alternatively it may hang loosely by a chain or strap from the body of the vehicle, and in this case the pull is taken by chains from the centre of the bar to the ends of the axle.

The action of a swingletree is to balance the pull from alternate shoulders as the animal walks.  It is used especially when the animal is in a breastcollar harness, because this can easily rub the shoulders if the pull is uneven.  It is needed less for an animal in a horse collar, as the pull does not pass over the shoulders in the same way.  For this reason heavier vehicles may have no swingletree, as they are normally pulled with a horse collar.

See also
Breastcollar
Draft horse
Draught animal
Horse collar
Horse harness
Horse-drawn vehicles

Horse harness